HMS Wren (U28) was a Black Swan-class sloop of the Royal Navy. She was active during the Second World War and was a successful anti-submarine warfare vessel, being credited with the destruction of five U-boats.

The sloop was popularly identified with the Wrens throughout its war service, and received frequent visits from them when in port.

Construction
Wren was ordered on 13 April 1940 under the 1940 Building Programme; she was laid down by William Denny & Brothers of Dumbarton on 27 February 1941.  Launched on 11 August 1942 she was completed on 4 February 1943, with a build time of 23 months and 5 days. 
The Black Swan class sloops were subject to numerous modifications during the building process, so much so that the design was revised, later ships (of the 1941 Programme and onwards) being described as the Modified Black Swan class. Although Wren was laid down under the original design, she was completed later than some of the Modified class ships, and with the modifications during her build was indistinguishable from the later Modified Black Swan vessels.

She was adopted by the Civil community of Knutsford and Northwich in Cheshire, as part of the Warship Week National Saving programme in 1942.

Service history
Wren was commissioned on 4 February 1943 and after working up was assigned to FJ Walker's 2nd Support Group, the most successful anti-submarine warfare group of the Royal Navy during World War II.

In February Wren, and 2SG, were on support duty in the Atlantic, though they saw little action.

In June they were assigned to the Bay of Biscay, supporting Coastal Command's Operation Musketry. On 24 June Wren, with others, found and destroyed U-449 off Cape Ortegal.

On 30 July  the group engaged three U-boats, already under air attack; all three were destroyed, with Wren sharing credit for U-504.

Following a refit in autumn 1943 Wren rejoined the group, supporting inbound convoy SL147/MKS 38, under attack by Igel group,  and Atlantic convoys HX278 and ON 224.  under attack by Hai group.

In late March Wren and the group were with Arctic convoy JW 58, which saw four U-boats destroyed in a five-day running battle.

In May in the Atlantic once more, Wren took part in the destruction of U-473 after a prolonged search and a "hunt to exhaustion".

In June and July Wren and 2SG were in the Channel as part of Operation Neptune, protecting the Allied invasion force from U-boat attack. In August Wren and others destroyed U-608 off the French coast.

After a further refit Wren was reassigned to 22EG in January 1945, engaged in anti-submarine patrols off the coast of Britain.

In March 1945 Wren was nominated to join the British Pacific Fleet, but had not done so before August 1945 and the end of the war in the east. Wren was paid off, but re-commissioned in 1946 for service in the Middle East. In April 1949 she commenced a refit at Malta dockyard. This involved the removal of the Anti-Submarine equipment on the Quarterdeck, which was replaced with extra accommodation. She was eventually paid off in 1955, and sold for scrap arriving at Rosyth for breaking up on 2 February 1956.

Battle Honours
During her service Wren was awarded four battle honours.
Atlantic 1943-45
Biscay 1943-44 
Normandy 1944 
Arctic 1944

Successes
During her service Wren was credited with the destruction of five U-boats.

Notes

References

 P Elliott : Allied Escort Ships of World War II (1977)  
 R Gardiner, R Gray : Conway's All the World's Fighting Ships 1906–1921 (1985)  
 Paul Kemp  : U-Boats Destroyed  ( 1997) . 
 Axel Neistle  : German U-Boat Losses during World War II  (1998). 
 Warlow, B : Battle Honours of the Royal Navy (2004)

External links
  HMS Wren at navalhistory.net 
 HMS Wren at uboat.net

 

1943 ships
Black Swan-class sloops
World War II sloops of the United Kingdom